The 1988 Soviet Chess Championship was the 55th edition of USSR Chess Championship. Held from 25 July 19 August 1988 in Moscow. The title was shared by the world champion Garry Kasparov and former world champion Anatoly Karpov. Semifinals took place at Norilsk and Pavlodar; two First League tournaments (qualifying to the final) were held at Lvov and Sverdlovsk.

Qualifying

Semifinals 
Semifinals, consisted of two Swiss tournaments, took place at Norilsk and Pavlodar in August 1987, from which eight each went on to the First League.

First League 
Top four qualified for the final.

Final 
Mikhail Tal withdrew after one round (draw against Rafael Vaganian) due to illness and was replaced by Vereslav Eingorn. A play-off between the first two was planned, but it ended up not taking place, with the Soviet Federation declaring Kasparov and Karpov winners of the gold medal.

References 

USSR Chess Championships
1988 in chess
1988 in Soviet sport